M-5 highway (formerly part of M-2 highway east of Ribarevine) is a Montenegrin roadway.

History
The M-5 highway was part of historical M-2 highway in Montenegro. Construction on this highway began in 1953 and finished in 1971.

In January 2016, the Ministry of Transport and Maritime Affairs published bylaw on categorisation of state roads. With new categorisation, part of previous M-2 highwaywas designated as M-5 highway.

Major intersections

References

M-5